Zelindopsis is a genus of parasitic flies in the family Tachinidae. There are about nine described species in Zelindopsis.

Species
These nine species belong to the genus Zelindopsis:
 Zelindopsis cornuta Verbeke, 1962
 Zelindopsis duplaria Villeneuve, 1943
 Zelindopsis illita (Villeneuve, 1916)
 Zelindopsis nigripalpis (Verbeke, 1962)
 Zelindopsis nigrocauda (Curran, 1927)
 Zelindopsis nudapex (Curran, 1940)
 Zelindopsis stativa (Villeneuve, 1943)
 Zelindopsis villeneuvei Verbeke, 1962
 Zelindopsis zenia (Curran, 1940)

References

Further reading

 
 
 
 

Tachinidae
Articles created by Qbugbot